Live in Amsterdam is a live combination CD/DVD set from alternative rock band Fishbone. It was shot and recorded in digital 24 track sound at the Melkweg Theatre in Amsterdam, the Netherlands during the infamous High Times Cannabis Cup Festival in 2002 on the last night of a 14-week tour. High Times Creative Director Steven Hager was the director of the video recording, and Aaron Strebs edited the live 4-camera mix. Interviews for the DVD were shot later by Mike Esterson, producer of the CD and DVD.

The album contains songs from Fishbone's entire 23-year career, from the early 1980s ska classic "Skankin' to the Beat" to the later metal/soul infused "AIDS & Armageddon". The complete concert is featured as an audio concert on disc one and a full live concert DVD on disc two.

Track listing

Personnel
Angelo Moore - saxophone, vocals
Walter A. Kibby II - trumpet, vocals
Spacey T - guitar
John Norwood Fisher - bass guitar, vocals
John Steward - drums

Fishbone albums
Fishbone video albums
2005 live albums
2005 video albums
Live video albums